Straut (also Stewart Station) is an unincorporated community in southern Pike County, Illinois, United States. The community is approximately four miles east of Nebo.

Notes

Unincorporated communities in Pike County, Illinois
Unincorporated communities in Illinois